Robbie Fraser may refer to:

 Scottish film maker Robbie Fraser

 A River City character played by actor Gary Lamont

 A current youth player at Rangers Football Club.